Zharkov or Jarkov is a Russian masculine surname, its feminine counterpart is Zharkova or Jarkova. Notable people with the surname include:
 
Andrei Zharkov, Soviet ice dancer
Daniil Zharkov (born 1994), Russian ice hockey player
Georgi Zharkov (1918–1981), Russian football player and coach
Innokenti Zharkov (born 1996), Russian football player 
Katya Zharkova, Belarusian model and actress
Lyudmila Maslakova (née Zharkova in 1952), Soviet sprinter
Olga Jarkova (born 1979), Russian curler
Vladimir Zharkov (born 1988), Russian ice hockey player
Dmitry Zharkov,4 times world dance sport champion

See also
Jarkov Mammoth

Russian-language surnames